Podi may refer to:

 PODi, a digital printing industry organization
 Podi, Bar, a village in Montenegro
 Podi, Herceg Novi, a village in Montenegro
 Podi, Croatia, a village near Trilj
 Podi Patharakari, a character in the Sri Lankan television series Salsapuna
 Podi Wije, Sri Lankan criminal